The Tale of Peter Rabbit is a children's book written and illustrated by Beatrix Potter that follows mischievous and disobedient young Peter Rabbit as he gets into, and is chased around, the garden of Mr. McGregor. He escapes and returns home to his mother, who puts him to bed after offering him chamomile tea. The tale was written for five-year-old Noel Moore, the son of Potter's former governess, Annie Carter Moore, in 1893. It was revised and privately printed by Potter in 1901 after several publishers' rejections, but was printed in a trade edition by Frederick Warne & Co. in 1902. The book was a success, and multiple reprints were issued in the years immediately following its debut. It has been translated into 36 languages, and with 45 million copies sold it is one of the best-selling books in history.

Since its release, the book has generated considerable merchandise for both children and adults, including toys, dishes, foods, clothing, and videos. Potter was one of the first to be responsible for such merchandise when she patented a Peter Rabbit doll in 1903 and followed it almost immediately with a Peter Rabbit board game. Peter Rabbit has remained popular amongst children for more than a century and continues to be adapted and expanded through new book editions, television, and film.

Plot
The story focuses on Peter, a young rabbit, and his family. Peter’s mother, Mrs. Rabbit, intends to go shopping for the day and allows Peter and her other three children, Peter’s sisters: Flopsy, Mopsy, and Cottontail to go playing. She tells them they can go anywhere they like, but not to enter the vegetable garden of an old man named Mr. McGregor, whose wife, Mrs. McGregor, put their father in a pie after he entered and got caught by Mr. McGregor. Peter's three younger sisters obediently stay away from Mr. McGregor’s garden, choosing to go down the lane and gather blackberries, but Peter enters Mr. McGregor’s garden in the hopes of eating some vegetables.

Peter ends up eating more than is good for him and goes looking for parsley to cure his stomach ache. Peter is seen by Mr. McGregor, who chases Peter. Peter gets caught in a net and three friendly sparrows comfort him. Peter manages to escape Mr. McGregor just in time, but loses his blue jacket and shoes while running off. He hides in a greenhouse, ultimately jumping into a watering can for protection, unfortunately there is water inside the watering can so Peter gets wet and sneezes, alerting Mr. McGregor. When Mr. McGregor gets tired after running Peter and resumes his work, Peter tries to escape, but is completely lost in the huge garden. Peter tries getting a young Mouse to help him, however she is collecting food for her family and cannot help. Peter also notices a Cat sitting by a pond. Peter considers asking for directions, but ultimately decides not to, having been warned about cats by his cousin. However, Peter sees that Mr. McGregor is "gone" and it buys him some time to escape to the gate. Peter sees from a distance the gate where he entered the garden and heads for it, despite being noticed and chased by Mr. McGregor again. With difficulty, he wriggles under the gate, and escapes from the garden. His abandoned clothing is used by Mr. McGregor to dress a scarecrow.

After returning home late, a sick Peter is reprimanded by his mother for losing his shoes and his jacket (the second jacket and shoes he has lost in a fortnight). Peter’s mother puts him to bed early without supper. To cure his stomach-ache, Mrs. Rabbit gives Peter a teaspoon of chamomile tea. Flopsy, Mopsy, and Cotton-tail, meanwhile, enjoy a delicious dinner of milk, bread and blackberries.

Characters
 Peter - Peter is a naughty rabbit who disobeys his mother. (He is the eldest of the four little rabbits.)
 Flopsy - Flopsy is Peter's sister who is a good rabbit. (She is the second youngest the four siblings.)
 Mopsy - Mopsy is a rabbit and Peter's sister who always obeys her mother. (She is the second oldest of the four.)
 Cotton-tail - Cotton-tail is a sweet rabbit and Peter's sibling. As her name says, she's soft as cotton. (She is the youngest of the four.)
 Mr. McGregor - Mr. McGregor owns a beautiful garden that is filled with delicious fruits and vegetables. Peter's father was put into a pie by Mrs. McGregor.

Composition
The story was inspired by a pet rabbit Potter had as a child, which she named Peter Piper. Through the 1890s, Potter sent illustrated story letters to the children of her former governess, Annie Moore. In 1900, Moore, realizing the commercial potential of Potter's stories, suggested they be made into books. Potter embraced the suggestion, and, borrowing her complete correspondence (which had been carefully preserved by the Moore children), selected a letter written on 4 September 1893 to five-year-old Noel that featured a tale about a rabbit named Peter. Potter biographer Linda Lear explains: "The original letter was too short to make a proper book so [Potter] added some text and made new black-and-white illustrations...and made it more suspenseful. These changes slowed the narrative down, added intrigue, and gave a greater sense of the passage of time. Then she copied it out into a stiff-covered exercise book, and painted a coloured frontispiece showing Mrs Rabbit dosing Peter with chamomile tea".

Publication history

Private publication

As Lear explains, Potter titled The Tale of Peter Rabbit and Mr. McGregor's Garden and sent it to publishers, but "her manuscript was returned ... including Frederick Warne & Co. ... who nearly a decade earlier had shown some interest in her artwork. Some publishers wanted a shorter book, others a longer one. But most wanted coloured illustrations which by 1900 were both popular and affordable". The several rejections were frustrating to Potter, who knew exactly how her book should look (she had adopted the format and style of Helen Bannerman's Little Black Sambo) "and how much it should cost". She decided to publish the book herself, and on 16 December 1901 the first 250 copies of her privately printed The Tale of Peter Rabbit were "ready for distribution to family and friends".

First commercial edition
In 1901, as Lear explains, a Potter family friend and sometime poet, Canon Hardwicke Rawnsley, set Potter's tale into "rather dreadful didactic verse and submitted it, along with Potter's illustrations and half her revised manuscript, to Frederick Warne & Co.," who had been among the original rejecters. Warne editors declined Rawnsley's version "but asked to see the complete Potter manuscript" – their interest stimulated by the opportunity The Tale of Peter Rabbit offered the publisher to compete with the success of Helen Bannerman's wildly popular Little Black Sambo and other small-format children's books then on the market. When Warne inquired about the lack of colour illustrations in the book, Potter replied that rabbit-brown and green were not good subjects for colouration. Warne declined the book but left open the possibility of future publication.

Warne wanted colour illustrations throughout the "bunny book" (as the firm referred to the tale) and suggested cutting the illustrations "from forty-two to thirty-two ... and marked which ones might best be eliminated". Potter initially resisted the idea of colour illustrations, but then realized her stubborn stance was a mistake. She sent Warne "several colour illustrations, along with a copy of her privately printed edition" which Warne then handed to their eminent children's book illustrator L. Leslie Brooke for his professional opinion. Brooke was impressed with Potter's work. Fortuitously, his recommendation coincided with a sudden surge in the small picture-book market.

Meanwhile, Potter continued to distribute her privately printed edition to family and friends, with the celebrated creator of Sherlock Holmes, Arthur Conan Doyle, acquiring a copy for his children. When the first private printing of 250 copies was sold out, another 200 were prepared. She noted in an inscription in one copy that her beloved pet rabbit Peter had died.

Potter arrived at an agreement with Warne for an initial commercial publication of 5,000 copies. Negotiations dragged on into the following year, but a contract was finally signed in June 1902. Potter was closely involved in the publication of the commercial edition – redrawing where necessary, making minor adjustments to the prose and correcting punctuation. The blocks for the illustrations and text were sent to printer Edmund Evans for engraving, and she made adjustments to the proofs when she received them. Lear writes that "Even before the publication of the tale in early October 1902, the first 8,000 copies were sold out. By the year's end there were 28,000 copies of The Tale of Peter Rabbit in print. By the middle of 1903 there was a fifth edition sporting coloured endpapers ... a sixth printing was produced within the month"; and a year after the first commercial publication there were 56,470 copies in print.

American copyright
Warne did not copyright The Tale of Peter Rabbit when it was published in the United States and unlicensed editions of the book were produced, with the first being published by Henry Altemus Company in 1904.

Merchandising

Potter asserted that her tales would one day be nursery classics, and part of the "longevity of her books comes from strategy", writes Potter biographer Ruth MacDonald. She was the first to exploit the commercial possibilities of her characters and tales; between 1903 and 1905 these included a Peter Rabbit stuffed toy, an unpublished board game, and nursery wallpaper.

Considerable variations to the original format and version of The Tale of Peter Rabbit, as well as spin-off merchandise, have been made available over the decades. Variant versions include "pop-ups, toy theatres, and lift-the-flap books". By 1998, modern technology had made available "videos, audio cassette, a CD-ROM, a computer program, and Internet sites", as described by Margaret Mackey writing in The case of Peter Rabbit: changing conditions of literature for children. She continues: "Warne and their collaborators and competitors have produced a large collection of activity books and a monthly educational magazine". A plethora of other Peter Rabbit related merchandise exists, and "toy shops in the United States and Britain have whole sections of [the] store specially signposted and earmarked exclusively for Potter-related toys and merchandise".

Unauthorized copying of The Tale of Peter Rabbit has flourished over the decades, including products only loosely associated with the original. In 1916, American Louise A. Field cashed in on the popularity by writing books such as Peter Rabbit Goes to School and Peter Rabbit and His Ma, the illustrations of which showed him in his distinctive blue jacket. In an animated movie by Golden Films, The New Adventures of Peter Rabbit, "Peter is given buck teeth, an American accent and a fourth sister Hopsy." Another video "retelling of the tale casts Peter as a Christian preacher singing songs about God and Jesus."

Literary praise
Writing in Storyteller: The Classic that Heralded America's Storytelling Revival, in discussing the difference between stories that lend themselves well to telling and stories that lend themselves well to reading, Ramon Ross explains Peter Rabbit is a story created for reading. He believes Potter created a good mix of suspense and tension, intermixed with lulls in the action. He goes on to write that the writing style—"the economy of words, the crisp writing"—lends itself well to a young audience.

Lear writes that Potter "had in fact created a new form of animal fable: one in which anthropomorphic animals behave as real animals with true animal instincts", and a form of fable with anatomically correct illustrations drawn by a scientifically minded artist. She further states Peter Rabbit's nature is familiar to rabbit enthusiasts "and endorsed by those who are not ... because her portrayal speaks to some universal understanding of rabbity behaviour." She describes the tale as a "perfect marriage of word and image" and "a triumph of fantasy and fact".

According to Stuart Jeffries, "...psychoanalytic critiques of her work have multiplied since her death in 1943." Carole Scott writes in Beatrix Potter's Peter Rabbit that the reader cannot help but identify with rebellious little Peter and his plight as all the illustrations are presented from his low-to-the-ground view, most feature Peter in close-up and within touching distance, and Mr. McGregor is distanced from the reader by always being depicted on the far side of Peter. Scott explains: "This identification dramatically instills fear and tension in the reader, and interacts with the frequently distanced voice of the verbal narrative", sometimes with contradictory effects. In the verbal narrative and the illustration for the moment when Mr. McGregor attempts to trap Peter under a garden sieve, for example, the verbal narrative presents the murderous intent of Mr. McGregor as a matter-of-fact, everyday occurrence while the illustration presents the desperate moment from the terrified view of a small animal in fear of his life – a view that is reinforced by the birds that take flight to the left and the right.

In the illustration of Peter standing by the locked door, the verbal narrative describes the scene without the flippancy evident in the moment of the sieve. The inability to overcome obstacles is presented in the verbal narrative with objective matter-of-factness and the statement, "Peter began to cry" is offered without irony or attitude, thus drawing the reader closer to Peter's emotions and plight. The illustration depicts an unclothed Peter standing upright against the door, one foot upon the other with a tear running from his eye. Without his clothes, Peter is only a small, wild animal but his tears, his emotions, and his human posture intensifies the reader's identification with him. Here, verbal narrative and illustration work in harmony rather than in disharmony. Scott suggests Potter's tale has encouraged many generations of children to "self-indulgence, disobedience, transgression of social boundaries and ethics, and assertion of their wild, unpredictable nature against the constrictions of civilized living."

Frank Delaney notes "a self-containment" in Potter's writing reflective of an uninterested mother and a lonely childhood spent in the company of pets. John Bidwell, curator at the Morgan Library & Museum in New York, observed "...the sardonic humor that makes Beatrix Potter so much fun for kids and grown-ups."

Adaptations 

In 1938, shortly after the success of Snow White and the Seven Dwarfs, Walt Disney became interested in making an animated film based on The Tale of Peter Rabbit. However, in a letter to a friend, Potter wrote that she refused Walt Disney's "scheme to film Peter Rabbit", saying, "I am not very hopeful about the result. They propose to use cartoons; it seems that a succession of figures can be joggled together to give an impression of motion. I don't think the pictures would be satisfactory... I am not troubling myself about it!"
 
In 1935, the story was loosely adapted in the Merrie Melodies short film, Country Boy. It shows some modifications in relation to Beatrix Potter's original story, most notably the Rabbit family surname is changed to "Cottontail" and Peter having two brothers and a sister rather than 3 sisters. In 1971, Peter Rabbit appeared as a character in the ballet film The Tales of Beatrix Potter. In late 1991, HBO aired an animated musical adaptation of The Tale of Peter Rabbit, narrated by Carol Burnett, as part of the network's Storybook Musicals series, which was later released to VHS by Family Home Entertainment under HBO licence. In 1992, the tale was adapted to animation again for the BBC anthology series, The World of Peter Rabbit and Friends, along with The Tale of Benjamin Bunny. In 2006, Peter Rabbit was heavily referenced in a biopic about Beatrix Potter entitled Miss Potter. In December 2012, a new CGI-animated children's TV series titled Peter Rabbit premiered on Nickelodeon, with a full series run beginning in February 2013. 

In February 2018, a 3D live-action/CGI animated feature film titled Peter Rabbit, directed by Will Gluck, was released. Voice roles were played by James Corden, Daisy Ridley, Margot Robbie, and Elizabeth Debicki, and live action roles played by Domhnall Gleeson, Rose Byrne, and Sam Neill. A sequel was released in 2021.

References

Footnotes

Works cited

External links

The Tale of Peter Rabbit Audio Book at Project Gutenberg
 
The Tale of Peter Rabbit Digital Book at The University of Iowa Libraries. Replaced(Flash) version (July 2020)
 World of Peter Rabbit: A website maintained by Potter's first publisher Frederick Warne & Co.

1902 children's books

 British children's books
Children's books adapted into films
Children's books adapted into television shows
Books about rabbits and hares
Frederick Warne & Co books
British picture books